Jim Lister (born 26 February 1981) is a Scottish former footballer who played as a forward. Lister played in the Juniors for Oakley United, Camelon Juniors and Bathgate Thistle and in the Scottish Football League for Stenhousemuir, Berwick Rangers, Alloa Athletic, Brechin City, Dumbarton, Airdrieonians and Forfar Athletic.

Career
Lister's career began in the Scottish Junior Leagues firstly at Oakley United, then after moving in July 2007, at Camelon Juniors.

In 2008, he moved up to the Scottish Football League for the first time, playing as a trialist for Stenhousemuir against Dumbarton on 18 March. He then agreed to sign for Stenhousemuir at the end of the 2007–08 season. However, on 21 May 2008, it was announced that he had instead signed for Berwick Rangers. He scored his first goal for Berwick on 4 October 2008, in a 1–1 draw against Elgin City.

Lister then dropped back down into the Juniors, having been linked with a number of clubs, before signing for Bathgate Thistle. On 19 June 2010, he joined Second Division club Alloa Athletic saying he had wanted the chance to return to senior football.

After one season at Alloa, Lister moved to Brechin City on 31 May 2011. One year later he moved clubs again, this time signing for First Division club Dumbarton. At the end of the season Lister was voted Player of the Year by the Dumbarton supporters.

On 11 May 2013, Lister signed for Airdrieonians. At the end of the 2013–14 season he signed a new one-year contract.

Lister joined Forfar in summer 2016 In November 2017, he announced his retirement, having suffered an injury that was expected to keep him out until at least the end of the season.

References

1981 births
Living people
Scottish footballers
Camelon Juniors F.C. players
Stenhousemuir F.C. players
Berwick Rangers F.C. players
Bathgate Thistle F.C. players
Alloa Athletic F.C. players
Brechin City F.C. players
Dumbarton F.C. players
Airdrieonians F.C. players
Forfar Athletic F.C. players
Scottish Junior Football Association players
Scottish Football League players
Scottish Professional Football League players
Association football forwards
Oakley United F.C. players